Abdul Hameed Muhammed Fazil (born 4 February 1949), known mononymously as Fazil, is an Indian film director, producer, screenwriter and actor who works in Malayalam cinema, in addition to directing a handful of Tamil films and a Telugu film. He made his directional debut with the 1980 film Manjil Virinja Pookkal. 

His popular films include Ente Mamattikkuttiyammakku (1983), Nokkethadhoorathu Kannum Nattu (1984), Poovinu Puthiya Poonthennal (1986), Manivathoorile Aayiram Sivarathrikal (1987), Ente Sooryaputhrikku (1991), Pappayude Swantham Appoos (1992), Manichitrathazhu (1993), Harikrishnans (1998). 
His 1993 film Manichitrathazhu won the National Film Award for Best Popular Film Providing Wholesome Entertainment. He won the Best Director award at the 13th Kerala State Film Awards for his 1984 film Ente Mamattukkuttiyammakku.

Early life 
His father wanted him to be a doctor, but in school and college, extra curricular activities dominated his time. He wrote plays and staged them with his friends; Nedumudi Venu was his college mate while he was in S.D. College, Alleppey, and this group was perhaps the first mimicry team that entertained crowds. "I used to mimic stars like Sathyan, Prem Nazir, Sivaji Ganesan and Govindankutty." He completed his graduate and post-graduation degrees  in economics from department of economics, S.D. College Alappuzha .

Film career 
Since the early 1980s, Fazil has directed 31 movies. His freshman film was in the Malayalam filmdom with Manjil Virinja Pookkal, produced by Navodaya Appachan, which was also Mohanlal's first movie. 

With numerous Malayalam films, as well as several Tamil films and one Telugu film, Fazil has won the most State awards.

Personal life 
Fazil has two sons, Fahadh Faasil and Farhaan Faasil, and two daughters. Fahadh and Farhaan are both actors working primarily in the Malayalam film industry.

Filmography

Directed films

Produced films

As writer

As actor

Awards 
National Film Awards
 1993 – National Film Award for Best Popular Film Providing Wholesome Entertainment for Manichitrathazhu
 Kerala State Film Awards
 1993: Best Film with Popular Appeal and Aesthetic Value – Manichithrathazhu
 1986: Best Film with Popular Appeal and Aesthetic Value – Ennennum Kannettante
 1984: Best Film with Popular Appeal and Aesthetic Value – Nokketha Dhoorathu Kannum Nattu
 1983: Best Film – Ente Mamattikkuttiyammakku
 1983: Best Director – Ente Mamattikkuttiyammakku
 1980: Best Film with Popular Appeal and Aesthetic Value – Manjil Virinja Pookkal

 Filmfare Awards South
 1985: Best Director in Tamil for Poove Poochooda Vaa

See also 
 List of Malayalam films from 1976 to 1980
 List of Malayalam films from 1981 to 1985
 List of Malayalam films from 1986 to 1990
 List of Malayalam films from 1991 to 1995
 List of Malayalam films from 1996 to 2000

References

External links 
 

1949 births
Living people
Film directors from Kerala
Malayalam film directors
Tamil film directors
Kerala State Film Award winners
Malayali people
Filmfare Awards South winners
21st-century Indian film directors
20th-century Indian film directors
Artists from Alappuzha
Film producers from Kerala
Businesspeople from Alappuzha
Writers from Alappuzha
20th-century Indian dramatists and playwrights
Malayalam screenwriters
Screenwriters from Kerala
Directors who won the Best Popular Film Providing Wholesome Entertainment National Film Award
People from Alappuzha district